Alfredo Ramírez Bedolla (born 22 February 1976) is a Mexican politician affiliated with the National Regeneration Movement and current Governor of Michoacán. He run as a candidate for the mayoralty of Morelia in 2015 but he was not elected. In 2018, he run for to represent the local congress.

References

1976 births
Living people
21st-century Mexican politicians
Governors of Michoacán
Members of the Chamber of Deputies (Mexico)
Morena (political party) politicians
Politicians from Michoacán